Rubén Eduardo Marroquín Meléndez, known as Rubén Marroquín (born 10 May 1992) is a Salvadoran professional footballer who plays as a defender for Primera División club FAS.

International
He was selected to be an alternate in case of the injury for Salvador's squad at the 2015 CONCACAF Gold Cup, but was not called up.

He made his El Salvador national football team debut on 17 July 2017, in a 2017 CONCACAF Gold Cup game against Jamaica, as a starter.

He was also selected for El Salvador's 2019 CONCACAF Gold Cup squad.

References

External links
 
 

1992 births
People from San Salvador Department
Living people
Salvadoran footballers
El Salvador international footballers
Association football defenders
C.D. FAS footballers
Alianza F.C. footballers
Primera División de Fútbol Profesional players
2017 CONCACAF Gold Cup players
2019 CONCACAF Gold Cup players
El Salvador youth international footballers